Parbatta Assembly constituency is an assembly constituency in Khagaria district in the Indian state of Bihar.

Overview
As per Delimitation of Parliamentary and Assembly constituencies Order, 2008, No. 151 Parbatta Assembly constituency is composed of the following: Parbatta community development block; Ratan, Gogri, Jamalpur North, Jamalpur South, Rampur, Muskipur, Pasraha, Basudeopur, Itahari, Sherchakla, Paikant, Deotha, Gauchhari, Madarpur gram panchayats and Gogri Jamalpur notofoed area of Gogri CD Block.

Parbatta  Assembly constituency is part of No. 25 Khagaria (Lok Sabha constituency).

Members of Legislative Assembly

Election results

2020

2015

References

External links
 

Assembly constituencies of Bihar
Politics of Khagaria district